The UCPH Department of Geosciences and Natural Resource Management (Institut for Geovidenskab og Naturforvaltning - IGN) is a department under the Faculty of Science at University of Copenhagen (UCPH).

History
In 2007, the Royal Veterinary and Agricultural University, KVL, merged into the University of Copenhagen, becoming the Faculty of Life Sciences. Departments were not changed until 2012, when the Faculty of Life Sciences was split up and merged with the Faculty of Science and the Faculty of Health and Medical Sciences. The merger of faculties also brought along a restructuring and merger of several departments. IGN was newly established out of the main part of the Department for Forest, Landscape and Planning and the Department for Geography and Geology. Both departments have been results of mergers a few years earlier.

The Department of Geography and Geology was established in 2007 by merging the two, former separate departments at the University of Copenhagen. The Department for Forest, Landscape and Planning was established in 2004 by a merger of the former public research institute Forest & Landscape, the Department of Economy, Forest and Landscape at KVL, the Forest and Landscape College and the DANIDA Centre for forest seeds. The brand Forest & Landscape still exists as cross-departmental cooperation.

Organisation
The department is organized in the following sections:
 Section for Geography
 Section for Geology
 Section for Forest, Nature and Biomass
 Section for Landscape Architecture and Planning
 Forest and Landscape College

Location

The department's secretariat as well as the Sections for Landscape Architecture and Planning, Section for Forest, Nature and Biomass are based at Rolighedsvej 23 in the university's Frederiksberg Campus. The site comprises the former building of Københavns Sygehjem as well as a modern extension by Rørbæk & Møller Arkitekter from 2013.

The Section for Geography and the Section for Geology are based at Øster Voldgade 10.

The Forest and Landscape College is based in Nødebo at Gribskov to the north of Copenhagen. It has additional facilities at Eldrupgård in Auning in Djursland.

Programmes

Bachelor´s programmes
 Geology–Geoscience (Danish)
 Geography & Geoinformatics (Danish)
 Landscape Architecture (Danish)
 Natural Resources(Danish)

Master´s programmes
 Geology-Geoscience
 Geography and Geoinformatics
 Landscape Architecture
 Forest and Nature Management
 Agricultural Development
 Environmental and Natural Resource Economics 
 Nature Management
 Climate Change
 Sustainable Forest and Nature Management
 Sustainable Tropical Forestry

Professional bachelor´s programmes 
 Urban Landscape Engineer 
 Forestry and Landscape Engineer

Vocational programme 
 Skilled Forest and Landscape Craftsmen

Arboreta
The department maintains three arboreta, two in Hørsholm and one in Greenland. Hørsholm Arboretum comprises approximately 2,000 species, making it the biggest collection of different trees and bushes in Denmark. The Urban Tree Arboretum is a collection of trees that are traditionally used or hold qualities that make them particularly well suited for use in urban environments. Pruning of different species of trees is systematically executed and their reactions thereto are registered. The Freenlandic Arboretum in Narsarsuaq has an area of 150 hectares and comprises approximately 110 species from about 600 provenances, making it one of the most extensive tree-line arboreta in the world.

References

University of Copenhagen